Dániel Szalai (born 5 September 1996) is a Hungarian professional footballer who plays for Békéscsaba.

Club career
On 5 June 2021, Szalai signed a contract with Budafok.

On 30 July 2022, Szalai returned to Békéscsaba.

Club statistics

Updated to games played as of 18 November 2014.

References

External links
MLSZ 
HLSZ 

1996 births
People from Kecskemét
Sportspeople from Bács-Kiskun County
Living people
Hungarian footballers
Association football forwards
Kecskeméti TE players
Békéscsaba 1912 Előre footballers
Zalaegerszegi TE players
Budafoki LC footballers
Nemzeti Bajnokság I players
Nemzeti Bajnokság II players